Nuno Leal Maia (born 17 October 1947) is a Brazilian actor and former football manager. Born in Santos, São Paulo, Maia started his career as a stage actor in the 1970s, and then debuting on cinema in the 1973 film Anjo Loiro starred by Vera Fischer. Maia became notorious for his role on the 1979 pornochanchada film Bem Dotado – O Homem de Itu, having appeared in more than 30 films since then as well as in television series and telenovelas.

Selected filmography

 A Virgem (1973) as Mário
 Anjo Loiro (1973)
 Cada um Dá o que Tem (1975) (segment "Despejo, O")
 Estúpido Cupido (1976, TV Series) as Acioly
 Paranóia (1976) as Pimenta
 O Quarto da Viúva (1976)
 Guerra é Guerra (1976) (segment "Núpcias com Futebol")
 Chão Bruto (1976)
 Gente Fina É Outra Coisa (1977)
 Elas São do Baralho (1977)
 Lady on the Bus (1978) as Carlinhos
 O Bem Dotado - O Homem de Itu (1978) as Lírio
 O Escolhido de Iemanjá (1978)
 O Bom Marido (1978) as Borba Gato
 Embalos Alucinantes: A Troca de Casais (1978) as Ramon
 As Amantes de Um Homem Proibido (1978) as Leandro
 O Caso Cláudia (1979)
 O Princípio do Prazer (1979) as Jangadeiro
 Inquietações de Uma Mulher Casada (1979)
 Perdoa-me Por Me Traíres (1980) as Gilberto
 Ato de Violência (1981) as Antonio Nunes Correia
 Mulher Objeto (1981) as Hélio
 Índia, a filha do Sol (1982) as Sivério
 Alguém (1982)
 Ao Sul do Meu Corpo (1982) as Policarpo
 Gabriela (1983) as Eng. Rômulo
 Águia na Cabeça (1984) as César
 Kiss of the Spider Woman (1985) as Gabriel
 Rei do Rio (1985) as Tucão
 A Gata Comeu (1985, TV Series) as Fábio Coutinho
 As Sete Vampiras (1986) as Detective Raimundo Marlou
 Solidão, Uma Linda História de Amor (1989)
 Top Model (1989-1990, TV Series) as Gaspar Kundera
 O Escorpião Escarlate (1990) as Guido Falcone
 Vamp (1991-1992, TV Series) as Jurandir (Padre Garotão)
 Pedra sobre Pedra (1992, TV Series) as Laíre
 Samba Syndrom (1992)
 Oceano Atlantis (1993)
 Louco Por Cinema (1994) as Lula
 História de Amor (1995, TV Series) as Edgar Assunção
 As Feras (1995) as Paulo Cintra
 Malhação (1995-2013, TV Series) as Prof. Paulo Pasqualette / Augusto Massafera / Fábio
 Meu Bem Querer (1998, TV Series) as Inácio Alves Serrão
 O Quinto dos Infernos (2002, TV Mini-Series) as Castro
 Um Lobisomem na Amazônia (2005) as Prof. Scott Corman
 O Profeta (2006-2007, TV Series) as Alceu
 Duas Caras (2007-2008, TV Series) as Bernardo
 Onde Andará Dulce Veiga? (2008) as Rafic
 Faça Sua História (2008, TV Series) as Passageiro
 Tainá 3: The Origin (2011) as Vô Teodoro
 Amor Eterno Amor (2012, TV Series) as Ribamar
 Chuteira Preta (2019, TV Series) as Jair
 Estação Rock (2020)

References

External links
 

1947 births
Brazilian male film actors
Brazilian male television actors
Living people
People from Santos, São Paulo